Port Greville is a rural community in Cumberland County, Nova Scotia.  It is home of the Age of Sail Museum of maritime history.

Port Greville was the location of the construction of many sailing ships used in trade mainly with the American New England states. Many sea captains came from the area with names such as Wagstaff, Pettis and Merriam.

One such vessel was the three masted schooner 'Minas King', captained by George Merriam with his cousin J.Randall Merriam operating as first mate. Randall Merriam later became a Master Mariner (inland waters) and captained several of the Canadian National ferries operating between Cape Tormentine New Brunswick and Borden PEI.

References

Communities in Cumberland County, Nova Scotia